Copelatus notius is a species of diving beetle. It is part of the genus Copelatus in the subfamily Copelatinae of the family Dytiscidae. It was described by Omer-Cooper in 1965.

References

notius
Beetles described in 1965